Chicken balls are a food consisting of small, spherical or nearly spherical pieces of chicken. They are prepared and eaten in several different cuisines.

In Western Chinese cuisine

Chicken balls are a type of modern Chinese food served in Canada, Ireland, United States, and the United Kingdom as a staple of Chinese take-out. The dish consists of small chunks of fried chicken breast meat covered in a crispy batter coating. They are often served with curry sauce, sweet and sour sauce or plum sauce. These are largely unheard of in China, depending on the recipe and referred name.

In East and Southeast Asian cuisines
Another kind of chicken balls, which are similar to southern Chinese fish balls, may be found in countries in East and Southeast Asia, such as the Philippines and Japan (tsukune).

In other cuisines
Chicken balls are also a part of several other culinary traditions, including Italian Jewish cuisine and Islamic cuisine.photo

See also
Canadian Chinese cuisine
Chicken nugget

References

External links

Canadian Chinese restaurant menu featuring chicken balls

Canadian Chinese chicken dishes